The Coyote Sisters were an American pop-rock female trio formed in 1980. Its members were Leah Kunkel, the younger sister of Cass Elliot; Marty Gwinn Townsend; and Renée Armand. Originally signed to Geffen Records until 1982, they were signed to Morocco Records, a subsidiary of Motown and released their self-titled debut LP in 1984. Lead single "Straight from the Heart (Into Your Life)" hit No. 66 on the US Billboard Hot 100 charts and was a bigger hit on the Adult Contemporary radio stations. Subsequent singles and the album were less successful.

The first self titled album was produced, recorded and mixed at David J. Holman Studio in Laurel Canyon.

In 2001, the group made an unexpected return to the music industry, this time as a duo without Armand, and released the album Women and Other Visions on Wannadate Records. Although Armand was no longer part of the group, she co-wrote one song on the album.

In 2003, they signed a distribution deal with BBN Music in cooperation with Wannadate Records to rerelease all of their previous work on CD and online.

Discography

Albums
 The Coyote Sisters (1984) #202 Billboard Bubbling Under The Top LPs
 Women and Other Visions (2001)

Singles
 "Straight from the Heart (Into Your Life)" — number 16, US Billboard Adult Contemporary; number 66, US Billboard Hot 100
 "I've Got a Radio" — number 39, US Billboard Adult Contemporary

Production 
 Produced by David J.Holman and co produced by Roger Paglia
 Recorded and mixed by David J. Holman at his studio in Laurel Canyon
 Mastering: Bernie Grundman

Musicians 
 Drums: Art Wood, Gary Ferguson, Mohamed Nircs
 Bass: Trey Thompson, Roger Paglia
 Guitar: Tony Berg
 Synthesizers: Michael Boddicker, David J.Holman, Tony Berg
 Horns: Jack Mack & The Heart Attack Horns
 Sax solo on "ANYBODY'S ANGEL": Phil Kenzie

References

External links 
 Official site

All-female bands
American girl groups
American pop rock music groups
American musical trios